Par Kola (also Romanized as Par Kolā, Par Kalā, Por Kalā, and Por Kolā) is a village in Ashrestaq Rural District, Yaneh Sar District, Behshahr County, Mazandaran Province, Iran. At the 2006 census, its population was 350, in 81 families.

References 

Populated places in Behshahr County